This is a list of the marine gastropods of Ireland. It is part of the List of marine molluscs of Ireland.

Marine gastropods
Akeridae
Akera bullata O. F. Müller, 1776

Aplysiidae
Aplysia depilans Gmelin, 1791
Aplysia fasciata Poiret, 1789
Aplysia punctata Cuvier, 1803

Acmaeidae
Tectura virginea (O. F. Müller, 1776)

Lepetidae
Iothia fulva (O. F. Müller, 1776)
Propilidium exiguum  (Thompson W., 1844)

Lottiidae
Testudinalia testudinalis  (O.F. Müller, 1776)

Patellidae
Helcion pellucidum  (Linnaeus, 1758)
Patella depressa  Pennant, 1777#
Patella ulyssiponensis  Gmelin, 1791
Patella vulgata  Linnaeus, 1758

Janthinidae
Janthina exigua Lamarck, 1816
Janthina janthina (Linnaeus, 1758)
Janthina pallida Thompson W., 1840

Acteonidae
Acteon tornatilis (Linnaeus, 1758)

Cylichnidae
Cylichna cylindracea (Pennant, 1777)

Diaphanidae
Colpodaspis pusilla M. Sars, 1870
Diaphana minuta T. Brown, 1827

Haminoeidae
Haminoea hydatis (Linnaeus, 1758)
Haminoea navicula (da Costa, 1778)

Philinidae
Laona pruinosa (Clark W., 1827)
Philine aperta (Linnaeus, 1767)
Philine catena (Montagu, 1803)
Philine denticulata (J. Adams, 1800)
Philine punctata (J. Adams, 1800)
Philine quadrata (S. V. Wood, 1839)
Philine scabra (O. F. Müller, 1784)

Retusidae
Retusa obtusa (Montagu, 1803)
Retusa truncatula (Bruguière, 1792)
Retusa umbilicata (Montagu, 1803)

Runcinidae
Runcina coronata (Quatrefages, 1844)

Scaphandridae
Roxania utriculus (Brocchi, 1814)
Scaphander lignarius (Linnaeus, 1758)

Cimidae
Cima minima (Jeffreys, 1858)

Ebalidae
Ebala nitidissima (Montagu, 1803)

Omalogyridae
Omalogyra atomus (Philippi, 1841)

Pyramidellidae
Brachystomia eulimoides (Hanley, 1844)
Brachystomia scalaris (Macgillivray, 1843)
Chrysallida clathrata (Jeffreys, 1848)
Chrysallida decussata (Montagu, 1803)
Chrysallida excavata (Philippi, 1836)
Chrysallida indistincta (Montagu, 1808)
Chrysallida interstincta (J Adams, 1797)
Chrysallida pellucida (Dillwyn, 1817)

Rissoellidae
Rissoella diaphana (Alder, 1848)
Rissoella globularis (Forbes & Hanley, 1852)
Rissoella opalina (Jeffreys, 1848)

Aclididae 
Aclis ascaris (Turton, 1819)
Aclis gulsonae (Clark W., 1850)
Aclis minor (Brown, 1827)

Aporrhaiidae
Aporrhais pespelecani  (Linnaeus, 1758)

Barleeidae
Barleeia rubra (Montagu, 1803)
Barleeia unifasciata (Montagu, 1803)

Caecidae
Caecum glabrum (Montagu, 1803)
Caecum imperforatum (Kanmacher in G Adams, 1798)

Capulidae
Capulus ungaricus  (Linnaeus, 1758)
Trichotropis borealis  Broderip & Sowerby G.B. I, 1829

Cerithiidae
Bittium reticulatum (da Costa, 1778)
Cerithium muscarum Say, 1822

Cerithiopsidae
Cerithiopsis barleei  Jeffreys, 1867
Cerithiopsis jeffreysi  Watson, 1885
Cerithiopsis tubercularis  (Montagu, 1803)

Cingulopsidae
Eatonina fulgida (Adams J., 1797)

Epitoniidae
Epitonium clathratulum (Kanmacher in G Adams, 1798)
Epitonium clathrus (Linnaeus, 1758)
Epitonium trevelyanum (Johnston, 1841)
Epitonium turtonis (Turton, 1819)

Eulimidae
Eulima bilineata Alder, 1848
Eulima glabra (da Costa, 1778)
Eulimella acicula (Philippi, 1836)
Eulimella compactilis (Jeffreys, 1867)
Eulimella scillae (Scacchi, 1835)
Eulimella ventricosa (Forbes, 1844)
Eulitoma compactilis (Sykes, 1903)
Melanella alba (da Costa, 1778)
Melanella frielei (Jordan, 1895)
Melanella lubrica (Monterosato, 1890)

Hydrobiidae
Hydrobia ulvae (Pennant, 1777)

Iravadiidae
Ceratia proxima (Forbes & Hanley, 1850)
Hyala vitrea (Montagu, 1803)

Lamellariidae
Lamellaria latens (O.F. Müller, 1776)
Lamellaria perspicua (Linnaeus, 1758)

Littorinidae
Lacuna crassior (Montagu, 1803)
Lacuna pallidula (da Costa, 1778)
Lacuna parva (da Costa, 1778)
Lacuna vincta (Montagu, 1803)
Littorina irrorata (Say, 1822)
Littorina littorea (Linnaeus, 1758)
Littorina mariae Sacchi & Rastelli, 1966
Littorina neglecta Bean in Thorpe, 1844
Littorina neritoides (Linnaeus, 1758)
Littorina nigrolineata J.E. Gray, 1839
Littorina obtusata Linnaeus, 1758
Littorina saxatilis (Olivi, 1792)
Littorina tenebrosa (Montagu)

Naticidae
Euspira catena (da Costa, 1778)
Euspira fusca (de Blainville, 1825)
Euspira montagui (Forbes, 1838)
Euspira pulchella (Risso, 1826)
Polinices fuscus (Blainville, 1825)
Polinices pulchellus (Risso, 1826)

Ovulidae
Simnia patula (Pennant, 1777)

Rissoidae
Alvania beanii (Hanley in Thorpe, 1844)
Alvania cancellata (da Costa, 1778)
Alvania punctura (Montagu, 1803)
Alvania semistriata (Montagu, 1808)
Alvania zetlandica (Montagu, 1815)
Cingula alderi (Jeffreys, 1859)
Cingula semicostata (Montagu, 1803)
Cingula trifasciata (Adams J., 1800)
Manzonia crassa (Kanmacher in G Adams, 1798)
Onoba aculeus (Gould, 1841)
Onoba proxima Forbes & Hanley, 1850
Onoba semicostata (Montagu, 1803)
Hyala vitrea (Montagu, 1803)
Pusillina sarsi (Lovén, 1846)
Pusillina inconspicua (Alder, 1844)
Rissoa interrupta (J. Adams, 1800)
Rissoa lilacina Recluz, 1843
Rissoa membranacea (J. Adams, 1800)
Rissoa parva (da Costa, 1778)

Skeneopsidae
Skeneopsis planorbis (O Fabricius, 1780)

Tornidae
Tornus subcarinatus (Montagu, 1803)
Tornus unisulcatus (G. W. Chaster, 1895)

Triphoridae
Marshallora adversa (Montagu, 1803)
Triphora perversa (Linnaeus, 1758)

Triviidae
Erato voluta (Montagu, 1803)
Trivia arctica (Pulteney, 1799)
Trivia monacha (da Costa, 1778)

Turritellidae
Turritella communis Risso, 1826
Turritella cingulata G. B. Sowerby I, 1825

Velutinidae
Velutina plicatilis (O. F. Müller, 1776)
Velutina velutina (O. F. Müller, 1776)

Buccinidae
Beringius turtoni (Bean, 1834)
Buccinum humphreysianum (Bennett, 1824)
Buccinum hydrophanum (Hancock, 1846)
Buccinum undatum Linnaeus, 1758
Chauvetia brunnea (Donovan, 1804)
Colus glaber (Kobelt, 1876)
Colus gracilis (da Costa, 1778)
Colus islandicus (Gmelin, 1791)
Colus jeffreysianus (Fischer, 1868)
Tritia incrassata (Strøm, 1768)
Tritia reticulata (Linnaeus, 1758)
Liomesus ovum (Turton, 1825)
Nassarius pygmaeus (Lamarck, 1822)
Nassarius reticulatus (Linnaeus, 1758)
Neptunea antiqua (Linnaeus, 1758)
Turrisipho fenestratus (Turton, 1834)
Turrisipho moebii (Dunker & Metzger, 1874)
Volutopsius norwegicus (Gmelin, 1791)

Conidae
Bela nebula (Montagu, 1803)
Bela powisiana (Dautzenberg, 1887)
Mangelia attenuata (Montagu, 1803)	
Mangelia brachystoma (Philippi, 1844)
Mangelia coarctata (Forbes, 1840)
Trophonopsis muricata (Montagu, 1803)
Philbertia gracilis (Montagu)
Raphitoma leufroyi (Michaud, 1828)
Philbertia teres (Reeve)
Propebela rufa (Montagu, 1803)
Propebela turricula Montagu, 1803

Muricidae
Boreotrophon truncatus (Ström, 1768)
Nucella lapillus (Linnaeus, 1758)
Ocenebra erinaceus (Linnaeus, 1758)
Trophonopsis barvicensis (Johnston, 1825)
Trophonopsis muricatus (Montagu, 1803)
Trophonopsis truncatus (Ström, 1768)

Turridae
Comarmondia gracilis (Montagu, 1803)
Raphitoma linearis (Montagu, 1803)
Raphitoma purpurea (Montagu, 1803)
Teretia anceps (Eichwald, 1830)
Haedropleura septangularis (Montagu, 1803)
Oenopota rufa (Montagu, 1803)
Oenopota turricula (Montagu, 1803)

Assimineidae
Assiminea grayana (Fleming, 1828)

Calyptraeidae
Crepidula fornicata (Linnaeus, 1758)

Hydrobiidae
Hydrobia acuta (Draparnaud, 1805)
Hydrobia ventrosa (Montagu, 1803)
Mercuria similis (Draparnaud, 1805)
Peringia ulvae (Pennant, 1777)
Ventrosia ventrosa (Montagu, 1803)

Truncatellidae
Truncatella subcylindrica (Linnaeus, 1767)

Pleurobranchidae
Berthella plumula (Montagu, 1803)
Pleurobranchus membranaceus (Montagu, 1815)

Nudibranchia

See also
 List of non-marine molluscs of Ireland

Lists of molluscs of surrounding countries:
 List of non-marine molluscs of Great Britain
 List of marine molluscs of Island

References

J.D. Nunn and J.M.C. Holmes A catalogue of the Irish and British marine Mollusca in the collections of the National Museum of Ireland ~ Natural History, 1835-2008
P. J. Hayward and J. S. Ryland Eds., 1999 The Marine Fauna of the British Isles and North-West Europe: Volume II: Molluscs to Chordates Oxford University Press 
Howson, C.M. & Picton, B.E.(eds) 1997. The species directory of the marine fauna and flora of the British Isles and surrounding seas.Ulster Museum and The Marine Conservation Society, Belfast and Ross-on-Wye.
 Gofas, S.; Le Renard, J.; Bouchet, P. (2001). Mollusca, in: Costello, M.J. et al. (Ed.) (2001). European register of marine species: a check-list of the marine species in Europe and a bibliography of guides to their identification. Collection Patrimoines Naturels, 50: pp. 180–213

External links 
 Roche C., Clarke S. & O’Connor B. (2005) Inventory of Irish marine wildlife publications. Irish Wildlife Manuals, No. 16. National Parks and Wildlife Service,Department of Environment, Heritage and Local Government, Dublin, Ireland.
Marine species identification portal
Natural History Museum Rotterdam Mollusca Images
Identification
Pruvot-Fol A., 1954  Mollusques Opisthobranches. Faune de France n° 58  460 p., 1 pl., 173 fig. PDF (21 Mo)

Fauna of Ireland
Ireland